Maynard is the second compilation album and 15th overall by Canadian jazz trumpeter Maynard Ferguson on Columbia Records. Another budget-priced album, Maynard was created as part of Columbia's "Jazz Odyssey" series.

In the album's liner notes, noted music critic Mort Goode states "This album underscores Maynard's dedication to the jazz composer."

Reissues
In 2011, Maynard was reissued with bonus tracks by Wounded Bird Records.

Track listing

Personnel

Production 

 Producer for Jazz Odyssey Series, Liner Notes – Mort Goode 
 Engineered for Jazz Odyssey Series by Arthur Kendy
 Re-mastered at CBS Recording Studios New York on the CBS DisComputer System by Harry Fein
 Design – John Berg
 Photography By – Benno Friedman

Notes

References

External links 
 

1980 albums
Big band albums
Columbia Records albums
Maynard Ferguson albums